The Modesto Symphony Orchestra (MSO) is an American orchestra based in Modesto, California. Founded in 1931, the MSO plays its concerts at the Gallo Center.

David Lockington is the current music director of the MSO and has held that role since 2007.

History
When the Modesto Symphony Orchestra (MSO) gave its first concert in 1931, Modesto had a population of 17,000 and was the smallest town in the United States to have a symphony orchestra.

A letter sent to musicians in December 1929 read:
We wish to organize an orchestra to be known as the Modesto Symphony Orchestra. With your cooperation and assistance, I believe we will be the only city of its size in the United States that can boast of having a symphony orchestra. We aim to give several concerts this winter and play the best there is in music."

In 1977, the MSO became a fully professional ensemble. Today, it consists of 75 - 85 professional musicians from the Central Valley and San Francisco Bay area, and is under the artistic direction of David Lockington, who began his tenure in the September 2007 as the Orchestra's eighth music director.

Notes

Musical groups established in 1931
Orchestras based in California